is a Japanese pop singer-songwriter.

Life and works 
She is known for having written "Hohoemi no Bakudan" (Smile Bomb), which is the opening theme for the YuYu Hakusho anime series. She also sang a few ending themes from the same anime, such as "Sayonara Bye Bye", "Homework ga Owaranai", and "Daydream Generation".

In the early 1990s, Mawatari Matsuko opened for the band Dreams Come True for their tour. She has also released five studio albums, four from Anime record label Remoras, and one from her own label, Pit'A'Pat. According to her website, she has retired from the music business. However, in 2012, it has been released a new album named KiseKi with the songs 1. PC Dakegashitteiru ; 2. Precious; 3. Netsu; 4. Middle Voice; 5. Kokorokoujou; 6. Time On Time; 7. B Gata; 8. Only Place; 9. Let Me Return Again; 10. AIR.

Discography

Singles 
 （Released May 21, 1992）
  (Released November 6, 1992）
 P-U（Released March 19, 1993）
 基-motoi-（Released November 19, 1993）
 （Release April 21, 1994）
 （Released October 21, 1994）
 （Released March 17, 1995)
 Passion in Energy (Released April 10, 2018)

Studio albums 
 Aitashi Gakunari Gatashi (Released June 19, 1992)
 Aitashi Gakunari Gatashi
 Kimi wa Shinzo Yaburi
 Fortuneteller
 Tsuitekanai
 Piripiri
 Summer Dust
 +, -, 0 (Plus, Minus, Zero)
 Otoko Tomodachi
 Engeru no Keisuu no Yoru
 Homework ga Owaranai

 Nice Unbalance (Released April 21, 1993)
 Nice Unbalance
 Shiran Kao
 Sayonara Bye-bye
 Aimai na Kisetsu
 P-U (Puuturou Mix)
 Forgive me, my kah-chan
 Glassica
 Uso ga Kirai na Toki
 Warui Mushi
 Hohoemi no Bakudan
 Rashiku mo Nai ne

 Amachan (Released May 20, 1994)
 Amachan
 Mr. Pressure (Remix)
 Monkey Bites (Drivin' Version)
 Majime ni Naru
 Free
 Ai o Semanaide
 Ruisen no Kanata Kara
 Motoi -motoi-
 Zip
 Kanashii Otona
 Anata o Aishite Yamazu
 Kokoro no Mama ni

 Barabushuka (Released April 21, 1995)
 Woman Woman
 Mudai
 Sanzan na Koi o Shite mo
 Hoshi no Kazu
 Premonition
 Birthday ga Noshikakaru
 Daydream Generation
 Penalty
 Kaeritai (Remix)
 Amachan (Omake special)

 Pops (Released March 20, 1997, and re-issued on December 17, 2005)
 Clean on the Smile
 Kagiri Aru Nichijo
 P-U (time limit version)
 Kaze no Katachi
 Science of Love
 Let's Be Human
 Forest
 (Tracks included on re-release Pops+)
 Shikyo ni Aishiteiru
 Who
 Beeswax

 Break a Theory: Enishi (Released November 2, 2016)
 Punk
 What made you do?
 free life
 Mirai no seed
 Risk
 Chain
 Hikari no Mae ni
 Turquiose
 Ashita e no Yoin
 Smooth

Other Album
  (Released October 22, 2001, in original instrumental collection)
 re:Birth (Released June 25, 2008, in Best Album Acoustic Version)
 KiseKi (Released May 4, 2012, COOLWIND LABEL first album)
  (Released December 6, 2013)
  (Released November 2, 2016, in mini-album as Matsuko Mawatari with Kurobuchi Brothers)

Best album
 The Best of Mawatari Matsuko (Released November 20, 2013)

External links 
 

1967 births
Living people
Japanese women singer-songwriters
Japanese women pop singers
Musicians from Miyazaki Prefecture
20th-century Japanese women singers
20th-century Japanese singers
21st-century Japanese women singers
21st-century Japanese singers